Tully Township is one of the fifteen townships of Marion County, Ohio, United States.  The 2010 census found 854 people in the township.

Geography
Located in the northeastern corner of the county, it borders the following townships:
Whetstone Township, Crawford County - north
Washington Township, Morrow County - east
Canaan Township, Morrow County - south
Claridon Township - southwest corner
Scott Township - west
Dallas Township, Crawford County - northwest corner

No municipalities are located in Tully Township, although the unincorporated community of Martel lies in the center of the township.

Name and history
Statewide, the only other Tully Township is located in Van Wert County.

Government
The township is governed by a three-member board of trustees, who are elected in November of odd-numbered years to a four-year term beginning on the following January 1. Two are elected in the year after the presidential election and one is elected in the year before it. There is also an elected township fiscal officer, who serves a four-year term beginning on April 1 of the year after the election, which is held in November of the year before the presidential election. Vacancies in the fiscal officership or on the board of trustees are filled by the remaining trustees.

References

External links
County website

Townships in Marion County, Ohio
Townships in Ohio